Emmelie Konradsson (born 9 April 1989) is a Swedish former footballer who played in midfield for Damallsvenskan club Umeå IK and the Sweden women's national football team.

Club career 

Konradsson joined Umeå IK in 2007. She extended her contract with the club in January 2013. In December 2014 Konradsson announced her retirement from football aged 25.

International career 

Konradsson made her debut for the senior Sweden team in a 2–1 loss to Canada on 22 November 2011.

Konradsson was favoured by coach Pia Sundhage who recalled her to the national team ahead of UEFA Women's Euro 2013. She played on the right wing for a pre tournament friendly with Norway.

References

External links 
 National team profile 
 Club profile 

Living people
1989 births
Swedish women's footballers
Sweden women's international footballers
Damallsvenskan players
Umeå IK players
Women's association football midfielders